Snuffer is a surname. Notable people with the surname include:

Denver Snuffer Jr., American lawyer and author
Rick Snuffer (born 1961), American politician